{{DISPLAYTITLE:C9H10O2}}
The molecular formula C9H10O2 (molar mass: 150.18 g/mol, exact mass: 150.06808 u) may refer to:

 Acetanisole
 Benzyl acetate
 Ethyl benzoate
 4-Hydroxyphenylacetone
 2-Methoxy-4-vinylphenol
 Methyl phenylacetate
 Methyl p-toluate
 Paracoumaryl alcohol
 Paroxypropione
 Phenylacetylcarbinol
 Phenylpropanoic acid